Nacer is a masculine given name and surname, commonly found in the Arabic and Persian languages. Alternative spellings of this name, possibly due to transliteration, include Naser, Nasser, Naseer, Nasr, and Nasir. People with this name include:

People with the given name Nacer 
 Nacer Abdellah (born 1966), retired Moroccan footballer
 Nacer Barazite (born 1990), Dutch footballer of Moroccan descent
 Nacer Bennemra (born 1989), Algerian footballer
 Nacer Bouhanni (born 1990), French racing cyclist
 Nacer Bouiche (born 1963), Algerian footballer
 Nacer Chadli (born 1989), Belgian footballer of Moroccan descent
 Nacer Guedioura (born 1954), Algerian former professional footballer
 Nacer Hammami (born 1980), Algerian football player
 Nacer Khemir (born 1948), Tunisian writer, artist, storyteller, and filmmaker
 Nacer Sandjak (born 1953), Algerian football manager and former player
 Nacer Zekri (born 1971), Algerian footballer

People with the surname Nacer 
 Badr Zaki Nacer (born 1988), Moroccan footballer
 Hassen Ben Nacer (born 1986), Tunisian racing cyclist
 Siham-Soumeya Ben Nacer (born 1983), Algerian tennis player

References 

Arabic masculine given names
Arabic-language surnames